Jason Knutzon (born January 24, 1976) is an American professional golfer.

 Knutzon is a member of the Asian Tour and the European Tour. He is one of few Americans who mainly play on the Asian Tour. Knutzon has been to PGA Tour Qualifying School once. He entered in 2000 but failed to earn a tour card. He played on the Nationwide Tour in 2001 but he only made 7 of 19 cuts and was unable to retain his card.

Knutzon joined the Asian Tour in 2003. In his rookie season he finished in 31st place on the Order of Merit and recorded three top 10 finishes. 

In 2004 Knutzon picked up his first professional win in China at the Macau Open. Pádraig Harrington participated in the tournament and finished 3 strokes behind. He ended up finishing in a career best 20th place on the Order of Merit. 

Knutzon picked up his second win in Indonesia at the Motorola International Bintan in 2007.

Knutzon played in 2005 and 2008 at the John Deere Classic. He finished tied for 58th place and earned $8,920 in 2005. Knutzon was a Monday qualifier for the tournament in 2005. Knutzon has two major appearances, the 2003 U.S. Open and the 2011 Open Championship.

Amateur wins (3)
1998 Iowa Masters, Fort Dodge Amateur, Northwest Amateur

Professional wins (2)

Asian Tour wins (2)

Results in major championships

CUT = missed the half-way cut
"T" = tied
Note: Knutzon never played in the Masters Tournament or the PGA Championship.

Results in World Golf Championships

See also
2010 European Tour Qualifying School graduates
2013 European Tour Qualifying School graduates
2015 European Tour Qualifying School graduates

References

External links

American male golfers
Iowa State Cyclones men's golfers
Asian Tour golfers
PGA Tour golfers
European Tour golfers
Golfers from Texas
Golfers from Iowa
Sportspeople from Lubbock, Texas
Sportspeople from Ames, Iowa
1976 births
Living people